The Electoral (Amendment) Act 2005 (No. 16) is a law of Ireland which revised Dáil constituencies in light of the 2002 census. The new constituencies took effect on the dissolution of the 29th Dáil on 29 April 2007 and a general election for the 30th Dáil on the revised constituencies took place on 24 May 2007.

Provisions
In July 2003, the Minister for the Environment, Heritage and Local Government established an independent Constituency Commission under terms of the Electoral Act 1997. The commission was chaired by Vivian Lavan, judge of the High Court, and delivered its report in January 2004. The Act implemented the recommendations of this report and repealed the Electoral (Amendment) (No. 2) Act 1998, which had defined constituencies since the 2002 general election. The size of the Dáil remained at 166, arranged in 43 constituencies (an increase in one since the previous revision).

It also made an amended the Electoral Act 1997 to clarify an issue raised by the Standards in Public Office Commission in relation to the definition of election expenses.

High Court challenge
The Act was challenged in the High Court by Finian McGrath TD and former TD Catherine Murphy on the grounds that it left too many constituencies under or over-represented. The High Court rejected this challenge.

Repeal of constituencies
The schedule of constituencies in this Act was repealed by the Electoral (Amendment) Act 2009, which created a new schedule of constituencies first used at the 2011 general election for the 31st Dáil held on 25 February 2011.

Constituencies for the 30th Dáil

''Key to columns
 Created: The year of the election when a constituency of the same name was last created.
 Seats: The number of TDs elected from the constituency under the Act.
 Change: Change in the number of seats since the last distribution of seats (which took effect in 2002).

Summary of changes
This list, and those below, summarises the changes in representation. It does not address revisions to the boundaries of constituencies.

References

Electoral 2005
2005 in Irish law
Acts of the Oireachtas of the 2000s